Handler Ridge is a prominent ridge about  long which serves as a divide between Croll Glacier and the upper portion of Trafalgar Glacier in the Victory Mountains of Victoria Land, Antarctica. It was mapped by the United States Geological Survey from surveys and U.S. Navy air photos, 1960–64, and was named by the Advisory Committee on Antarctic Names in 1969 for Dr. Philip Handler, then Chairman of the National Science Board and President of the National Academy of Sciences.

References

Ridges of Victoria Land
Borchgrevink Coast